Crassula natans, commonly known as floating pigmyweed, is a herb in the family Crassulaceae.

The annual herb is often found in an aquatic environment. It blooms between July and November producing white-pink flowers.

The plant is endemic to the wetlands of Cape Fold area of the Western Cape region of South Africa.
It has become naturalised in Western Australia where it is found in winter wet depressions and in gullies and lakes in the Great Southern, Wheatbelt, South West and Peel regions. It is also found throughout southern South Australia, New South Wales and Victoria.

References

natans
Plants described in 1794
Flora of Western Australia
Saxifragales of Australia
Flora of South Africa